Ocean's Eleven may refer to: 

Ocean's 11 (1960 film), the original heist film starring all five members of the Rat Pack
Ocean's Eleven (2001 film), a remake of the above film with George Clooney, Brad Pitt, and Matt Damon